Beryllium chloride is an inorganic compound with the formula BeCl2. It is a colourless, hygroscopic solid that dissolves well in many polar solvents. Its properties are similar to those of aluminium chloride, due to beryllium's diagonal relationship with aluminium.

Structure and synthesis
Beryllium chloride is prepared by reaction of the metal with chlorine at high temperatures:
Be + Cl2 → BeCl2
BeCl2 can also be prepared by carbothermal reduction of beryllium oxide in the presence of chlorine. BeCl2 can be prepared by treating beryllium with hydrogen chloride.

Two forms (polymorphs) of BeCl2 are known. Both structures consist tetrahedral Be2+ centers interconnected by doubly bridging chloride ligands.  One form consist of edge-sharing polytetrahedra.  The other form resembles zinc iodide with interconnected adamantane-like cages. In contrast, BeF2 is a 3-dimensional polymer, with a structure akin to that of quartz. 

In the gas phase, BeCl2 exists both as a linear monomer and a bridged dimer with two bridging chlorine atoms where the beryllium atom is 3-coordinate. The linear shape of the monomeric form is as predicted by VSEPR theory. The linear shape contrasts with the monomeric forms of some of the dihalides of the heavier members of group 2, e.g. CaF2, SrF2, BaF2, SrCl2, BaCl2, BaBr2, and BaI2, which are all non-linear.  Beryllium chloride dissolves to give tetrahedral [Be(OH2)4]2+ ion in aqueous solutions as confirmed by vibrational spectroscopy.

Reactions
Beryllium chloride forms a tetrahydrate, BeCl2•4H2O ([Be(H2O)4]Cl2). BeCl2 is also soluble in some ethers.

Applications
Beryllium chloride is used as a raw material for the electrolysis of beryllium, and as a catalyst for Friedel-Crafts reactions.

References

External links
 Properties of BeCl2 from NIST

Beryllium compounds
Chlorides
Alkaline earth metal halides
Acid catalysts
Inorganic polymers